Transformers are two metal sculptures depicting characters from the Transformers media franchise that were installed outside of the Georgetown home of Newton Howard, a brain and cognitive scientist who is a professor at Georgetown University in Washington, D.C. The two-ton (1,814 kg) sculptures were made from recycled motorcycle and car parts and depict Bumblebee and Optimus Prime. They were installed in January 2021, leading to a mixed reaction from locals and legal challenges from the Old Georgetown Board and local Advisory Neighborhood Commission.

Howard's work with artificial intelligence and implant prosthetic technology inspired him to have the sculptures commissioned by an unnamed artist. Additional sculptures are inside his house, located on Prospect Street NW in the Georgetown Historic District. Due to regulations in historic districts and overseeing public and private designs by the Old Georgetown Board, Howard was told to remove them. He was eventually granted permission to have the sculptures displayed temporarily.

History

Installation
In January 2021 brain and cognitive scientist Newton Howard, who specializes in artificial intelligence, replaced two planter boxes with two metal sculptures in front of his house at 3614 Prospect Street NW in the Georgetown neighborhood of Washington, D.C. The two-ton (1,814 kg) sculptures depict Bumblebee and Optimus Prime, characters from the Transformers media franchise, and measure approximately 10 feet (3 m) tall. Howard moved into the house in mid-2020 after he left Oxford University's Computational Neuroscience Laboratory and began working as a professor at nearby Georgetown University.

Howard has many robots inside his house and other Transformers sculptures made of recycled motorcycle and car parts, the same material used for the Optimus Prime and Bumblebee sculptures outside. He commissioned an unnamed artist to create the Transformers sculptures to display in his office and home. Howard stated why he chose Transformers: "They represent the coalition of men and machine, working in harmony but as distinct entities. We create robotic and prosthetic arms and all of these things to compensate for damage. That does not make us robots. There are two distinct structures and creations, you know? Or at least that's what I believe, while there are others who believe robots will take over the world." 

In an interview with Slate magazine Newton said the sculptures were commissioned "because the Transformers represent human and machine living in harmony, if you will." When the journalist asked, "So that's why you have Autobots, not Decepticons", Newton replied, "Oh, so you understand!" Howard's interest in Transformers is also based on his work with the KIWI chip, which is a "1.2 by 2.2 millimeter implant prosthetic that interfaces with the brain in various regions you implant it in," and can potentially help people living with neurodegenerative disorders. According to Howard, "The Transformers are machines that have the core logic of a human. The KIWI chip has the core logic of a machine, inside a human."

Reaction

Legal challenges
According to Howard, the immediate reaction from the public after the sculptures were installed was positive. People would pose for photos and leave notes in his mailbox or on his door. The reaction from local officials was different. A city inspector told Howard he would need a public space permit for the sculptures since the property line ends at the façade of his house along the sidewalk. Howard noted the previous planter boxes were displayed on brick platforms attached to the house and had been there for many years.

In March 2021, the local Advisory Neighborhood Commission, ANC 2E, unanimously rejected Howard's request for a permit. ANC officials said they did not reject the request based on the sculptures' aesthetic but rather that Howard needed approval from the Old Georgetown Board, which the United States Commission of Fine Arts (CFA) appoints to regulate public and private designs in the Georgetown Historic District. The  ANC commissioner that represents the area of Prospect Street NW where Howard's home is located said, "It's one of those funny things that people think it's their own property but it's actually public space...It needs to be reviewed by the Old Georgetown Board. Procedurally this did not happen in the right order." Howard responded that if the Old Georgetown Board denied his permit, he would take up the issue in court because it was an issue of free expression and that it was helping the environment because the sculptures are made of recycled material.

Government officials were not the only ones that had a negative reaction to the sculptures. Some of Howard's neighbors, including a co-founder of the Prospect Street Citizens Association who lives two doors down from Howard, said installing the sculptures was a "selfish and unilateral act,' could potentially harm property values of neighboring homes, and that the people who were posing for photos were not social distancing during the COVID-19 pandemic.

Former NBC News correspondent Luke Russert, who lives next door to Howard, spoke out against the sculptures at the ANC meeting. Russert said it was a safety hazard that people would stop and take photos, including those who would double-park to get out of their vehicles for photos. He also said letting the sculptures stay could create a precedent: "What's to stop someone from putting up a statue of Joseph Stalin and saying, 'Well this is provocative, it's art, it speaks to me?'" Howard responded to his neighbors' complaints that they were acting entitled. 

Some people and organizations spoke out for and against the sculptures at the meeting before the Old Georgetown Board. Stephen duPont, an architect and zoning expert hired by Howard, defended the sculptures citing their artistic value. There were also neighborhood children who asked the board to keep it. The Citizens Association of Georgetown and Prospect Street Citizens Association argued the sculptures were out of place in the historic district and would create a precedent whereby homeowners could display various objects without input. The board ruled that they would decline a permit for Howard to display the sculptures due to regulations concerning historic districts. Board members said they would be open to granting a permit for a temporary installation that would last six to eight months. The board later sent an email to Howard granting him a permit to have the sculptures remain for six months, starting from the day he submitted a request, April 16.

By late 2021 Howard said the sculptures were becoming more accepted amongst some locals and that they continued to be popular with people posing for Instagram photos. He also said the CFA was working with him to explore the installation of 16 other Transformers sculptures throughout the city, a project funded by the Howard Brain Sciences Foundation. Despite the six-month temporary permit that began in April 2021, the sculptures were still displayed outside Howard's house as of 2022.

Defenders
In an opinion piece for The Washington Post, a Georgetown University student criticized Russert's analogy of a Stalin statue since Stalin represented dictatorship while Transformers are the "embodiment of the typical American industrious extravagance — and the endless life-changing possibilities through which technology can help us 'restore human dignity.'" Dan Kois of Slate said the sculptures "deliver grandeur and whimsy to the modern cityscape,' that they were "spectacular," and that they are "lovingly crafted, immense, and tacky." A neighborhood news site pointed out that Howard's house and the adjoining houses were not older buildings, like most in the neighborhood, but were built in the mid-20th century and designed to mimic the Federal architecture style, thus not harming the historic nature of the neighborhood.

See also
 List of public art in Washington, D.C., Ward 2
 Outdoor sculpture in Washington, D.C.

References

External links
 "Two Statues in Public Place", presented to the United States Commission of Fine Arts
 "Transformer Statues Spark Battle Among Georgetown Residents", video report by WRC-TV

2021 sculptures
Georgetown (Washington, D.C.)
Metal sculptures
Outdoor sculptures in Washington, D.C.
Statues of fictional characters
Transformers (franchise)